Desmostylidae is an extinct family of herbivorous marine mammals belonging to the order of Desmostylia.  They lived in the coastal waters of the northern Pacific Ocean from the Early Oligocene (Rupelian) through the Late Miocene (Tortonian) (33.9 mya—7.2 MYA)

Taxonomy and systematics
It was assigned to Sirenia by Osborn (1905); to Proboscidea by Abel (1919); to Desmostyliformes by Simpson (1932), Kretzoi (1941) and Reinhart (1959); to Desmostylia by McKenna and Bell (1997); and to Desmostylia by Carroll (1988), Inuzuka et al. (1995), Inuzuka (2000) and Barnes and Goedert (2001).

 found a subadult specimen of Behemotops proteus on Vancouver Island in 2007.  They noted that (1) the cranial features of their specimen were similar to those of Cornwallius and that (2) the adult dentition was not delayed in their specimen, unlike in Desmostylus and other Afrotheria, and they concluded that (1) Desmostylidae and Paleoparadoxiidae probably diverged earlier than previously believed and that (2) delayed dentition can not be the most primitive state of Desmostylia.

Classification
Classification after Chib 2016:
 Desmostylidae:
 Cornwallius
 Behemotops
 Desmostylus
 Kronokotherium
 Ounalashkastylus

References

 
 
 

Desmostylians
Oligocene mammals
Miocene mammals
Tortonian extinctions
Rupelian first appearances
Prehistoric mammal families